The Shelburne River is a 53 km long river in Nova Scotia, Canada. It is a wilderness river and is a tributary of Mersey River. It starts in the Tobeatic Wilderness Area.

The Shelburne River was designated a Canadian Heritage River in 1997.

See also
List of rivers of Nova Scotia

References 
 Canadian Heritage Rivers System
 Government of Nova Scotia

Rivers of Nova Scotia
Canadian Heritage Rivers